HAT-P-13c is a substellar object orbiting the star HAT-P-13 located 698 light years away from Earth in the constellation of Ursa Major. A search for transits was negative, however only 72% of the possible transit configurations could be ruled out. With a mass at least 15.2 times that of Jupiter, it may be a massive planet or a small brown dwarf. The gravitational effect of this object on the inner transiting planet HAT-P-13b may allow a precise determination of the inner planet's internal structure.

References

External links
 JPL PlanetQuest search

Exoplanets discovered in 2009
Brown dwarfs
Giant planets
Hot Jupiters
Ursa Major (constellation)
Exoplanets detected by radial velocity